Karpinski, Karpiński, or Karpinsky may refer to:

People
 Karpiński family, a Polish noble family
 Karpiński (surname), a Polish surname

Places
 Karpinskiy (crater) on the Moon
 Mount Karpinsky (disambiguation)
 Mount Karpinskiy in Antarctica
 Mount Karpinsky (Urals), in the Ural Mountains
 Karpinsky Ice Cap or Karpinsky Glacier,  large ice cap on October Revolution Island, Severnaya Zemlya, Russian Federation
 Karpinsky Group of volcanoes in the Kuril Islands

Other
Akademik Karpinsky, a number of ships

See also